Donnybrook may refer to:

Places

Australia
 Donnybrook, Queensland, Australia
 Donnybrook, Western Australia
 Donnybrook, Victoria, Australia
 Donnybrook railway station, Victoria, Australia

Canada
 Donnybrook, Ontario, a former village in southwest Ontario, Canada

Ireland
 Donnybrook, Dublin, Ireland
 site of the original Donnybrook Fair
 Donnybrook Stadium, Ireland, a rugby union stadium
 Donnybrook Cemetery
 Donnybrook, Douglas, County Cork, Ireland

South Africa
 Donnybrook, KwaZulu-Natal, South Africa

United Kingdom
 Donnybrook Quarter, a residential area in the Bow area of the East End of London

United States
 Donnybrook, North Dakota, United States
 Donnybrook, Oregon, United States

Other uses
 Donnybrook (film), a 2018 American-French drama film
 Donnybrook!, a 1961 Broadway musical

See also

 Donnybrook Fair (disambiguation)
 Donnybrook stone, a feldspathic and kaolinitic sandstone 
 Donnybrook Writing Academy, a collective of writers etc. in 1920s, and former internet blog 
 Donny Brook, a 1969 album by Don Patterson with Sonny Stitt